Corregidor is an island in the Philippines.

Corregidor may also refer to:

Corregidor (position), a Spanish judicial or administrative position
The Battle of Corregidor (1942), the World War II battle in which Japan took control of Corregidor Island, leading to the capture and occupation of the Philippines by Japan
The Battle of Corregidor (1945), the subsequent World War II battle in which the U.S. and Filipino troops regained control of Corregidor Island from Japan
Corregidor (film), a 1943 American film directed by William Nigh
Der Corregidor, a comic opera by Hugo Wolf
, a Philippines owned steamship